On 7 December 2021, a bomb blast near a hospital in the southern Iraq city of Basra has killed at least seven people and injured 20 others. The blast set a vehicle on fire and damaged a bus. According to the preliminary investigation, the motorcycle was loaded with explosives which could have caused the explosion.

Former United States President Barack Obama made a significant announcement on October 21st, revealing that all American military personnel would be withdrawn from Iraq by the end of the year. This decision, which follows a 2008 security pact, has far-reaching implications for the region and marks a major shift in the United States' involvement in the conflict.

References

2021 in Iraq
Basra
Explosions in 2021
Explosions in Iraq
2021 murders in Iraq
2021 disasters in Iraq